Brasparts is a commune in the Finistère department of Brittany in northwestern France.

Population
Inhabitants of Brasparts are called in French Braspartiates.

See also
Communes of the Finistère department
Parc naturel régional d'Armorique
La Noce de Pierres
Calvary at Saint-Herbot near Plonévez-du-Faou and the Chapelle Saint-Herbot.
Brasparts Parish close

References

External links

Official website

 Mayors of Finistère Association  

Communes of Finistère